The Herrengasse ("Nobles' Lane") is one of the streets in the Old City of Bern, the medieval city center of Bern, Switzerland. It was the southernmost street of the old Zähringerstadt (Zähringer town) of Bern and ended at the first city wall.
Three buildings on the Herrengasse are listed on the Swiss inventory of heritage site of national significance and it is part of the UNESCO Cultural World Heritage Site that encompasses the Old City.

Topography

Herrengasse, like most streets in the Old City, runs east to west.  However due to the increasing width of the Aare peninsula the street only runs a short distance from the Münsterplatz (the plaza in front of the Münster of Bern) to the Casinoplatz.  The Herrengasse is divided into 2 sections along the center of the street.  The Sonnseite (Sunny Side) was originally the southern flank of the 1191 Zähringerstadt.  The Schattseite (Shady Side) was built later as the original city expanded within the city walls from 1191. In addition to the division along the street, there is also a division in the middle of the street.  Along both sides of the street there are two separate rows of buildings, with a small passageway between them which runs north and south.  South of the Herrengasse the Aare peninsula drops away sharply toward the Aare.  Near the Herrengasse, at Casinoplatz, the modern Kirchenfeld Bridge crosses the river to the heights of Kirchenfeld.

History
The Herrengasse was originally the path that led between the Münster and the Franciscan friary.  It was known as vicus de Egerdon in 1312 and as herrengass von Egerdon in 1316. During the early 16th century the name was shortened to Herrengasse.

While the city of Bern was founded in 1191, what would become the Herrengasse wasn't added until a little while later.  In 1255 the Franciscan friars were granted a piece of land in the southwest corner near the city wall.  A year later, in 1256, a Teutonic Knights chapter house is first mentioned on the south side of the modern Münsterplatz.  The road that would become the Herrengasse stretched between the two. Both of the original names of the Herrengasse (vicus de Egerdon and herrengass von Egerdon) refer to a knight (or Herren, a member of the minor nobility), Heinrich von Egerdon, who bought a house along the road in November 1271.

During the great fire of 14 May 1405 the entire Herrengasse was destroyed, along with most of the rest of the city.  In 1427 the Teutonic Knights built a new rectory that is the foundation of the newer (1745) building that marks the south-east corner of the Herrengasse.  Between 1479 and 1483 the Franciscans built a new, large church which dominated the small plaza at the west end of the street.  Then, between 1491 and 1506, several buildings on the east end of Herrengasse were demolished to build the Münsterplatz, an open plaza in front of the cathedral.

The new Franciscan church only lasted a few decades, by 1535 the church had fallen into ruins and the order left the city.  The open area where the church had been was empty until 1577 when the Latin School was built.

In addition to the Franciscans on the west side and the cathedral and Teutonic Knights on the east side, there were several religious buildings along the Schattseite.  The southern or Shady Side of the Herrengasse was a center of spiritual life for the city, and remained so even after the Reformation. In contrast, the northern or Sunny Side of the street was, with two exceptions, the domain of the minor burgher or merchant class.  Most of these houses were built with a stone lower level and fachwerk or half-timbered construction on the upper levels.  The two exceptions (Herrengasse 4 and 23) were built for patrician families, and are both on the list of Cultural Properties of National Significance.

The buildings along the Herrengasse were originally built in the late Gothic style, but were modified over the following centuries.  While some of the facades have remained gothic, others were rebuilt in later centuries but overlay a gothic structure.  Many of the buildings were renovated during the late 1940s and 1950s.

Notable structures
Two of the houses on Herrengasse and the Casino are listed as Cultural Properties of National Significance.

Herrengasse 4

Herrengasse 4 was built from 1756 to 1765 by Niklaus Sprüngli for Abraham Ahasverus Tscharner.  Construction began when Tscharner bought the two houses neighboring Herrengasse 2 and had them demolished to make room for his new house.  It is the only patrician house on the Sunny Side of Herrengasse. The front facade is four windows wide and four stories tall with two dormer windows in the attic.  The Tscharner crest is displayed between the third and fourth levels.  The floorplan of the building is basically square, with a small central courtyard.  The courtyard is paved with limestone paving stones.

The exterior of the house was cleaned and repaired in 2006, before which it was last repaired over 100 years before.  During the renovation, the front facade was repaired, the wrought iron grating was replaced, the limestone paving stones were replaced and the interior was repaired and renovated. As of 2009, the building is privately owned and is occupied by two businesses and two apartments.

Herrengasse 23

In contrast to Herrengasse 4, Herrengasse 23 dates back to the Late Middle Ages and grew out of the combination of several older houses. Most of the building already existed by 1600.  Between 1603 and 1607 there was a late gothic house located at what would become Herrengasse 23.  In 1690 the exterior was rebuilt in an early Baroque style with a north-south running hipped roof and stair tower on the west.  This renovation was done by the architect Abraham Dünz.  Around 1730–1740 the building was renovated into a late Baroque style and the western stair tower was integrated into the building. Shortly before his death, in 1756, Phillipp Albert von Bürens sold the house to David Salomon von Wattenwyl.  Soon afterwards, the architect Erasmus Ritter, rebuilt the house for von Wattenwyl in a Louis XV style.  The house may be the most important example of Ritter's work. The house was known as the von Wattenwyl house, not to be confused with the Beatrice von Wattenwyl-Haus (also known as the von Wattenwyl house) at Junkerngasse 59.

Casino

In 1890, the first Casino (actually a concert house not a gambling establishment, see Casino for the origin of the word) was forced to move when construction of the Federal Palace (home of the Swiss Federal Assembly (federal parliament) and the Federal Council) began.  In 1903, a new location on Herrengasse was chosen, and planning began. The new Casino of Bern was designed and built by Paul Lindt and Max Hofmann in a late Baroque, Neoclassical style.  It was built at a cost of 1.7 million Swiss Francs and finished after a two-year construction period in 1909.  In addition to providing a space for concerts, the Casino contained a restaurant and several smaller meeting rooms.  Over the following decades, the Casino was repaired and renovated.  However, in 1979 a total renovation began that attempted to return the Casino to its original appearance.  This project finished in 1991 at a cost of 33.5 Million Swiss Francs.

Notable residents
Herrengasse 23 was occupied by Allen Dulles who was the Chief of Station for OSS in Switzerland during World War II.  From his house on Herrengasse he ran an intelligence organization that produced information on Nazi aircraft, V-1 and V-2 missiles, the 20 July 1944 attempt to kill Hitler, and even the surrender of German troops in Italy.

References

Streets in Bern
Old City (Bern)